Cecilia Hyunjung Mo is currently an associate professor of Political Science at the University of California - Berkeley. She focuses her work and research on a number of issues including American Politics, Comparative Politics, Political Behavior, as well as Public Policy. A majority of her work is focused on the research methods and models surrounding bounded rationality, and other models of decision making.

Education 
Cecilia Hyungjung Mo has received her Bachelor of Arts in Mathematics & Interdisciplinary Studies from the University of Southern California. She went on the get her M.A. in Secondary Education from Loyola Marymount University. She has another M.A. in Political Science from Stanford University. In 2012 she received her Ph.D. in Political Economics.

Published works

Asian-American participation in U.S. Politics

Why Do Asian Americans Identify As Democrats? Testing Theories of Social Exclusion and Intergroup Solidarity 
Mo examines the causes of why Asian-American voters are majority Democrat. She looks at two major causes: 1) social exclusion and 2) intergroup solidarity. Her work goes on to identify possible explanations of racial political behavior in the United States electoral process.

Why Asian Americans don't Vote Republican 
Washington Post's article by Cecilia Mo discusses the possible explanations of why Asian Americans tend to lean more left than right. Her research focuses on the assumption that Asian Americans income would sway them more Republican, but offers instead that because of the political climate towards Asian Americans, they tend to vote Democrat.

Human Trafficking

Perceived Relative Deprivation and Risk: An Aspiration-Based Model of Human Trafficking Vulnerability

Selected awards 

 American Political Science Association 2015 Franklin L. Burdette Pi Sigma Alpha Award 
 International Society of Political Psychology 2018 Roberta Sigel Early Career Scholar Best Paper Award 
 American Political Science Association 2020 Emerging Scholar in Elections, Public Opinion and Voting Behavior Award

References 

American political scientists
American women political scientists
University of California, Berkeley faculty
Year of birth missing (living people)
Living people
University of Southern California alumni
Loyola Marymount University alumni
Stanford University alumni
21st-century American women